1,2-Diformylhydrazine is the chemical compound with the formula NH(CHO).  It is a white, water-soluble solid.  A related species is the monoformyl analog, called formic hydrazide (HCONH).

As verified by X-ray crystallography, it is a planar molecule with N-N, N-C, and C=O distances of 1.38, 1.33 and 1.24 Å, respectively.

References

Hydrazides